Pinjalo may refer to:

Pinjalo (genus), a genus of fishes in the family Lutjanidae
Pinjalo pinjalo, the fish species with the common name pinjalo
Pinjalo lewisi, the fish species with the common name slender or red pinjalo